Telluria chitinolytica is a bacterium from the genus Telluria in the Oxalobacteraceae family.

References

Burkholderiales
Bacteria described in 1993